The Capture of Gorée occurred in December 1758 when a British naval expedition led by Augustus Keppel against the French island of Gorée off the coast of Senegal during the Seven Years' War.

Keppel bombarded the fortress and then landed his marines to take possession. The French commander, Blaise Estoupan de Saint-Jean surrendered the fortress and the island. The 300-man garrison became prisoners of war, and 110 guns and mortars were captured.

The island was occupied by the British until 1763 when it was returned following the Treaty of Paris.

References

Bibliography

Conflicts in 1758
Battles of the Seven Years' War
Seven Years' War
Battles involving Great Britain
History of Senegal
Battles involving France
1758 in Africa